The women's long jump event  at the 1993 IAAF World Indoor Championships was held on 12 March.

Medalists

Results

Qualification
Qualification: 6.50 (Q) or at least 12 best performers (q) qualified for the final.

Final

References

Long
Long jump at the World Athletics Indoor Championships
1993 in women's athletics